The Church of St. Teresa of the Infant Jesus is a parish church in the Roman Catholic Archdiocese of New York, located at 1634 Victory Boulevard, Castleton Corners, Staten Island, New York City. The church was built in 1953 on the designs of the prolific architect Robert J. Reiley for $224,000. The church has a co-educational parochial school.

Father John Joseph O'Hara, a future bishop, served St. Teresa's as parochial vicar during 1992–2000 and then as pastor during 2000–2012.

References

External links
 Official website for St. Teresa Church
 Official website for St. Teresa School

Roman Catholic churches in Staten Island
Roman Catholic churches completed in 1953
Robert J. Reiley church buildings
1953 establishments in New York City
20th-century Roman Catholic church buildings in the United States